Louis Jauffret (born 21 February 1943) is a former French alpine skier.

Career
During his career he has achieved 4 results among the top 10 (2 podiums) in the World Cup.

World Cup results
Top 10

References

External links
 

1943 births
Living people
French male alpine skiers
20th-century French people